The Via Mare Voyagers were a professional men's volleyball team that played in the Philippine Super Liga (PSL). The team was owned by Via Mare Corporation, a restaurant chain.

Current roster
For the 2014 PSL All-Filipino Conference:

Coaching staff
 Head Coach: Sergio "VIP" Isada
 Assistant Coach(s): Andy Fiel

Team Staff
 Team Manager:
 Team Utility: 

Medical Staff
 Team Physician:
 Physical Therapist:

Honors

Team captain
  Jerrico Hubalde (2014)

References

External links
 PSL-Via Mare Voyagers Page

Philippine Super Liga
2014 establishments in the Philippines
Volleyball clubs established in 2014